Rocky Mountain House Airport  is located  north northeast of Rocky Mountain House, Alberta, Canada.

In June 2017, a team of airshow specialists kicked off the Canadian Arctic Aviation Tour, a series of air shows across Canada's North in celebration of the 150th anniversary of Canada. Some of the key performers were Team Rocket, Kyle Fowler, Bud and Ross Granley and Jerzy Strzyz.

References

External links
Place to Fly on COPA's Places to Fly airport directory

Registered aerodromes in Alberta
Clearwater County, Alberta
Rocky Mountain House